The 1910 Connecticut gubernatorial election was held on November 8, 1910. Democratic nominee Simeon Eben Baldwin defeated Republican nominee Charles A. Goodwin with 46.48% of the vote. This was the first such election in which a candidate won with only a plurality of the vote, as the state constitution no longer required a subsequent vote by the Connecticut General Assembly in the absence of a majority.

General election

Candidates
Major party candidates
Simeon Eben Baldwin, Democratic
Charles A. Goodwin, Republican

Other candidates
Robert Hunter, Socialist
Emil L. G. Hohenthal, Prohibition
Frederick Fellerman, Socialist Labor

Results

References

1910
Connecticut
Gubernatorial